Sepiadarium gracilis is a species of cuttlefish native to the Indo-Pacific; it occurs in the South China Sea and off the western Philippines.

The type specimen was collected in Philippine waters and is deposited at the National Museum of Natural History in Washington, D.C.

References

External links

Cuttlefish
Molluscs described in 1962